Duck rice is a Singaporean dish made of either braised or roasted duck and plain white rice. The braised duck is usually cooked with yam and shrimps; it can be served simply with plain white rice and a thick dark sauce; side dishes of braised hard-boiled eggs, preserved salted vegetables, or hard beancurd may be added.

In addition, the Teochew–based boneless duck rice is a similar, but a more refined dish; due to the slightly tougher texture of duck, the duck is artfully deboned and sliced thinly for the convenience and ease of the diner, allowing the sauces to seep into the meat; Singapore's Hainanese chicken rice and other similar dishes have followed this style due to the popularity. Along with chicken rice, this dish can commonly be found in hawker centres and food centers all over Singapore.

Variant
A similar variant known as the Singaporean braised duck also exists, known colloquially as Lor ark in Singaporean Teochew pronunciation. While similarly prepared, it usually doesn't involve rice and is eaten with hard boiled eggs.

See also
 Siu mei, Cantonese roast meats, often sold together with plain rice
 List of duck dishes
 List of rice dishes

References 

Chinese cuisine
Duck dishes
Singaporean cuisine